The discography of SOiL, an American rock band, consists of six studio albums, one live album, three extended plays and eleven singles.

Albums

Studio albums

Live albums

Compilation albums

Extended plays

Singles

References

External links
Soil at AllMusic

Discographies of American artists
Rock music group discographies